The 2007–08 Montenegrin First Handball League was second season of the Montenegrin First League of Men's Handball, Montenegro's premier handball league.

Participants 

The league regularly consists of eight teams, but in the season 2007/08 there were seven participants, because the team of Pljevlja quit. In the second part of season, four best clubs participated in the TOP4 league for champion, and the last three played in relegation league.

The following seven clubs participated in the Montenegrin First League 2007/08.

First part 

During the first part of the season, all members played 12 games. Four best placed teams - Berane, Sutjeska, Mornar and Lovćen continued season in the TOP4 league for champion. Other teams were playing league for relegation.

Table of the first part of the season:

TOP4 / relegation league 

At the final phase, RK Berane won the first champions' title in the club history.
In the relegation league, at the bottom was RK Boka.

TOP4 League

Relegation League

Summary 

 Promotion to the EHF Cup 2008/09: Berane, Lovćen Cetinje
 Promotion to the EHF Cup Winners' Cup 2008/09: Sutjeska Nikšić
 Promotion to the EHF Challenge Cup 2008/09: Mornar Bar, Budućnost Podgorica
 Relegation to the Second League 2008/09: Boka Tivat
 Promotion to the First league 2008/09: Stari Grad Budva, Rudar Pljevlja

Handball leagues in Montenegro
Hand
Hand
Monte